Noah Horowitz (born 1979) is an American art historian. Based in the US, Horowitz is Director Americas for Art Basel's show in Miami Beach since August 2015. He is a member of Art Basel's executive committee.

Career and background
Horowitz holds a PhD in art history from the Courtauld Institute of Art, London. His doctoral thesis, Art of the Deal: Contemporary Art in a Global Financial Market, was published by the Princeton University Press in 2011.
He was managing director of The Armory Show in New York from 2011 until 2015, which he managed to save in just three years. Prior to this, he worked as an associate at the Serpentine Galleries in London in 2008, and in 2009 he became Director of VIP Art Fair, a first-ever virtual international art fair. He is a regular lecturer on contemporary art and economics, as well as the author of a number of publications, which have appeared in The New York Times, Texte zur Kunst and The Art Newspaper. After working at Art Basel Miami Beach since 2015, he joined Sotheby's in September 20, 2021, as the Worldwide Head of Gallery and Private Dealer Services. After Marc Spiegler suddenly has stepped down in November 2022 as Global Director of Art Basel, Horowitz succeeded him as Chief Executive.

References

1979 births
Living people
American art historians
Alumni of the Courtauld Institute of Art